Henry C. Magruder (1844 – October 20, 1865) was a Confederate soldier and guerrilla during the American Civil War. Born in Bullitt County, Kentucky, he took part in several major Western theater battles. Still, he is best known for his fate as a guerrilla and was possibly the inspiration of a fictional local folk hero and guerrilla fighter, Sue Munday, whose exploits closely mirrored his own.

Army career
Magruder enlisted in the Confederate States Army at age 17 and served under General Simon Bolivar Buckner at the Battle of Fort Donelson. Magruder was captured when Buckner chose to surrender the fort rather than allow his men to fight their way out, but he soon escaped. Magruder joined the personal bodyguard of Confederate General Albert Sidney Johnston, serving under him at the Battle of Shiloh. Following General Johnston's death, Magruder transferred to General John Hunt Morgan's Kentucky Cavalry. He took part in Morgan's raid into Ohio and Indiana and once again escaped capture. He eventually crossed the Ohio River back into Kentucky.

Guerilla fighter
Magruder, now well behind U.S. lines, located other escaped Confederates and led them in raids against U.S. military targets south of Louisville. As historian Walter L. Hixson notes, "Magruder also plundered Union homes, burned alive an African-American man, and violated southern gender codes by raping the wife of a Union soldier and six other 'young ladies' at a school."  

Pro-U.S. home guards captured and arrested most of Magruder's small band after they robbed a bank in February 1865. Magruder and two others avoided capture for several weeks, but the three were eventually cornered in a barn and forced to surrender. Magruder had been seriously wounded, shot in the arm and back, and then shot in the lungs during capture.  

One of the men captured with Magruder was Marcellus Jerome Clarke. Clarke was quickly charged with being a guerrilla, convicted by a closed military tribunal, and hanged in March 1865. Magruder, however, was allowed to recover his health in jail before he was arraigned.

Published exploits
Before this, Louisville, Kentucky publisher George D. Prentice had written a series of articles about the area's ongoing guerrilla activities in his Louisville Journal, but attributed it to activities of a "Sue Mundy." These tales closely paralleled Clarke's and Magruder's actions. By some accounts, including his own posthumous memoir Three Years in the Saddle: The Life and Confession of Henry Magruder: The Original Sue Munday, The Scourge of Kentucky (1865), Magruder was the original inspiration for the fictitious Confederate guerrilla fighter.

Execution
Magruder, who admitted to committing eight murders, was convicted as a spy and a guerilla fighter and hanged in Louisville on October 20, 1865. While on death row, he converted to Catholicism. He confessed to a priest that he had done bad things. As Magruder was escorted from his cell to be executed, he remarked, "It is hard, but maybe it is fair."

References

1844 births
1865 deaths
Confederate war crimes
Confederate States Army soldiers
1863 murders in the United States
American escapees
Bushwhackers
Executed spies
Executed people from Kentucky
People from Bullitt County, Kentucky
Louisville, Kentucky, in the American Civil War
People of Kentucky in the American Civil War
People executed by the United States military by hanging
19th-century executions of American people
American Civil War prisoners of war
Escapees from United States military detention
Converts to Roman Catholicism